Carousel is a long-running multimedia comics slide show hosted by cartoonist Robert Sikoryak (Masterpiece Comics) that has been presented in various venues in the United States and Canada since 1997. Sikoryak has described Carousel as "a cartoon variety show." Carousel has been presented at Dixon Place, MoCCA Fest, Parsons School of Design, The Brick Theater, and other venues.

History
The first Carousel slide shows were projected using a slide projector. The show was named after the Kodak Carousel slide projector.

In 2011, The Village Voice called Carousel a highlight of The Brick Theater's Comic Book Theater Festival.

Many cartoonists, artists and voice actors have participated, including:

 Scott Adsit
 Todd Alcott
 Jonathan Ames
 Kate Beaton
 Gabrielle Bell
 Gregory Benton
 Nick Bertozzi
 Rupert Bottenberg
 Megan Montague Cash
 Victor Cayro
 Howard Chackowicz
 Sean Chiki
 Domitille Collardey
 Adam Conover
 Ann Decker
 Julie Delporte
 Brian Dewan
 Aaron Diaz
 Eric Drysdale
 Chris Duffy
 Jess Fink
 Emily Flake
 Nick Gazin
 Pascal Girard
 James Godwin
 Myla Goldberg
 Dale Goodson
 Patrick Hambrecht
 Lisa Hanawalt
 Tom Hart
 Dean Haspiel
 Glenn Head
 Danny Hellman
 Sam Henderson
 Lizz Hickey
 Bill Kartalopoulos
 Ben Katchor
 Kaz
 Susan Kim
 Julie Klausner
 John Kovaleski
 Hawk Krall
 Tim Kreider
 Michael Kupperman
 Miss Lasko-Gross
 M. Sweeney Lawless
 Leah Yael Levy
 Jeffrey Lewis
 Jason Little
 Kevin Maher
 Billy Mavreas
 Dyna Moe
 Neil Numberman
 Tao Nyeu
 George O'Connor
 Joe Ollmann
 Roxanne Palmer
 K. A. Polzin
 Jackson Publick
 Hans Rickheit
 Jason Roeder
 Dave Roman
 Laurie Rosenwald
 Laurie Sandell
 David Sandlin
 Allison Silverman
 Doug Skinner
 Karen Sneider
 Ted Stearn
 Leslie Stein
 Raina Telgemeier
 Matthew Thurber
 Jim Torok
 Ted Travelstead
 James Urbaniak
 Colleen AF Venable
 Lauren R. Weinstein
 Julia Wertz
 Shannon Wheeler
 Kriota Willberg
 Daniel Wright

References

External links
 

Works about comics